{{Infobox KHL team
| team   = Select4-u Devils Nijmegen
| colour     = background:#FFFFFF; border-top:#262262 5px solid; border-bottom:#ED1C24 5px solid;
| colour text= #000000
| logo      = AHOUD_Devils_Nijmegen_logo.png
| logosize  = 185px
| nickname   = 
| founded    = 1968
| folded  = 
| city   = Nijmegen, Netherlands
| arena      = Triavium
| capacity   = 1450
| league     = BeNe League2015-presentEerste Divisie2012-2015Eredivisie
1989-2011Dutch Cup| division   = 
| conference = 
| uniform    = 
| colours =   
| owner      = 
| gm         = 
| coach = Alexander Jacobs
| ass_coach  = Frank Janssen
| ass_coach2 =
| captain    = 
| president  = 
| affiliates = 
| website    = Select4-u Devils Nijmegen
| current    = 

| name1       = 
| dates1      = 
| name2       = 
| dates2      = 
}}

The Select4-u Devils Nijmegen  is an ice hockey club in Nijmegen, Netherlands, they play in the BeNe League, the top-tier league in the Netherlands and Belgium. Formerly the team played in the semi-professional Dutch Eredivisie where they were the 7 time national champions; the most recent championship was in 2009–2010. Home games are played at the Triavium. As of 2019, the team are sponsored by decorating firm AHOUD.

History
 
Ice hockey in Nijmegen began in 1968, with the Nijmegen Tigers winning its first national championship in 1984.  At the end of the 1980s, several players moved to Rotterdam to join the short-lived Rotterdam Panda's.  Beginning in the early 1990s, financial difficulties hurt the Nijmegen Tigers, forcing the team to dissolve and reform in 1994.  In 2003, the Tigers went bankrupt.  The Nijmegen Emperors joined the Eredivisie in 2004, winning the national championship in 2006.  However, the Emperors also went bankrupt in 2006.  In 2007, the Devils joined the league with a title sponsor.
In the 2009–10 season, the Devils won the Cup (In Dutch, "Beker"), an annual tournament of Eredivisie teams played before the beginning of the regular season, finished the regular season in first place, and won the national championship.

Season resultsNote:''' GP = Games played, W = Wins, OTW = Overtime Wins, OTL = Overtime Losses, L = Losses, GF = Goals for, GA = Goals against, Pts = Points

Roster
Updated March 8, 2019.

Championships

Eredivisie National Championships

Once (2009–10). 
(Seven times as Nijmegen Tigers: 1983–4, 1987–8, 1992–3, 1996–7, 1997–8, 1998–9, 1999–2000. 
Once as Nijmegen Emperors: 2005–06.)

 Bekers (Cups)

Once (2009)

Former players
 TJ Sakaluk
 Brad Smulders 
  Akim Ramoul 
Phil Aucoin

References

External links
 Select4u Devils Nijmegen official website 
 Netherlands Ice Hockey Federation 
 Ijshockey.com information on the Eredivisie teams 

BeNe League (ice hockey) teams
Ice hockey teams in the Netherlands
Ice hockey clubs established in 1981
1981 establishments in the Netherlands
Sports clubs in Nijmegen